Leucoagaricus erythrophaeus is a species of agaric fungus. Described as new to science in 2010, it is found in California, where it grows  in mixed forest. The specific epithet erythrophaeus originates from the Greek words ερυ𝛉ρος ("red" or "bloody") and ϕαιος ("dark"), and refers to the mushroom's characteristic bruising reaction. The species was formerly known under the misapplied name Lepiota roseifolia.

Similar species 
Leucoagaricus badhamii exhibits similar red staining.

See also
List of Leucoagaricus species

References

External links

erythrophaeus
Fungi of North America
Fungi described in 2010